In time series modeling, a nonlinear autoregressive exogenous model (NARX) is a nonlinear autoregressive model which has exogenous inputs. This means that the model relates the current value of a time series to both:
 past values of the same series; and
 current and past values of the driving (exogenous) series — that is, of the externally determined series that influences the series of interest.
In addition, the model contains an error term which relates to the fact that knowledge of other terms will not enable the current value of the time series to be predicted exactly.

Such a model can be stated algebraically as

 

Here y is the variable of interest, and u is the externally determined variable. In this scheme, information about u helps predict y, as do previous values of y itself. Here ε is the error term (sometimes called noise). For example, y may be air temperature at noon, and u may be the day of the year (day-number within year).

The function F is some nonlinear function, such as a polynomial. F can be a neural network, a wavelet network, a sigmoid network and so on. To test for non-linearity in a time series, the BDS test (Brock-Dechert-Scheinkman test) developed for econometrics can be used.

References 

 S. A. Billings. "Nonlinear System Identification: NARMAX Methods in the Time, Frequency, and Spatio-Temporal Domains, Wiley, 2013.
 I.J. Leontaritis and S.A. Billings. "Input-output parametric models for non-linear systems. Part I: deterministic non-linear systems". Int'l J of Control 41:303-328, 1985.
 I.J. Leontaritis and S.A. Billings. "Input-output parametric models for non-linear systems. Part II: stochastic non-linear systems". Int'l J of Control 41:329-344, 1985.
 O. Nelles. "Nonlinear System Identification". Springer Berlin, 2000.
 W.A. Brock,  J.A. Scheinkman, W.D. Dechert and B. LeBaron. "A Test for Independence based on the Correlation Dimension". Econometric Reviews 15:197-235, 1996.

External links
 Open-source implementation of the NARX model using neural networks

Time series models
Nonlinear time series analysis